Bataung is the most senior tribe of Bantu origin which descends from its ancestor Mohurutshe and which speaks the Sotho-Tswana group of languages, namely, Setswana, Sepedi, Sesotho and Lozi.

The Bataung people are found in the escarpment region of Southern Africa. Mohurutshe, Morotse, Ramathe, Barotse have a corresponding meaning. "Tau" is a Sotho-Tswana word meaning "Lion", and this animal is their totem. "Bataung" is a plurality of a lion meaning "people of a place of Lions or Lion's den".

Some of the Bataung based in the Free State were some among those who made up the army under King Moshoeshoe during the Free State–Basotho Wars with white settlers (thanks to the valiant Bataung ba ha Ramathe, Moshoeshoe defeated white settlers in battle). The entire Free State province, parts of Kwazulu-Natal, Gauteng and the Eastern Cape actually belong to Ramathe as a matter of historical fact.

The Bataung tribe modern day are found in all South African nations. They have clans in the Sepedi, Setswana, Sesotho and Nguni nations

Further reading
Sidney Berman, Analysing the Frames of the Bible: The Case of Setswana Translation of the Book of Ruth, Chapter 3, A History and Ethnographic Description of Batswana - Stellenbosch University. List of supporting thesis: Comaroff, Setiloane, Brown and others.

See also
Barotseland

Sotho-Tswana peoples in South Africa